Ross Docherty (born 23 January 1993) is a Scottish professional footballer who plays as a midfielder for Scottish Championship side Partick Thistle, of which he is also the club captain.

He has previously played for Livingston, Airdrieonians and Ayr United.

Career
Docherty was a youth player at Hillwood Swifts Boys Club, before joining Livingston at youth level in 2010. A member of the Under-19 team, Docherty made his first-team debut from the start on 7 May 2011, in Livingston's 3–1 win against Alloa Athletic in the Scottish Second Division. His next appearance was in the following season on 23 July 2011, as a substitute in Livingston's 5–0 win against Airdrie United in the Challenge Cup. He was released in May 2014.

On 22 November 2014, Docherty played as a trialist for Airdrieonians in a 1–0 defeat against Stranraer. He then signed for the club permanently in December 2014.

Ayr United
Docherty left The Diamonds in June 2015, signing for Scottish League One rivals Ayr United. He scored his first goal for the club on 11 May 2016, in a 1–1 draw against Stranraer in the first leg of the Scottish Championship play off final; the ball dropped at the edge of the box and he rifled it into the bottom corner earning Ayr a draw in the 94th minute. Ahead of the 2017–18 season, Docherty signed a new contract with Ayr and was named club captain.

Partick Thistle
In December 2019 it was announced in the press that Docherty had signed a pre-contract agreement to join former Ayr United manager Ian McCall at Partick Thistle for the start of the 2020/21 season, signing a two-year deal. In June 2020, following Thistle's relegation to Scottish League One, after the season was called early due to the Coronavirus pandemic, Docherty was officially announced as a Partick Thistle player.
Docherty scored his first goal for Thistle scoring the second in a 2–0 away win in League One over Forfar Athletic. After winning League One with Thistle, Docherty signed a new contract adding an extra year to his deal, extending it until 2023. 
Docherty scored his first goal of the 2021–22 season for Thistle, scoring a header from a corner in a 3–0 away win against Dunfermline.

Career statistics

Honours

Club
Ayr United 
 Scottish League One: 2017–18

Partick Thistle
Scottish League One: 2020–21

References

External links

1993 births
Living people
Scottish Football League players
Livingston F.C. players
Airdrieonians F.C. players
Ayr United F.C. players
Association football defenders
Scottish footballers
Footballers from Paisley, Renfrewshire
Scottish Professional Football League players
Partick Thistle F.C. players